Andipatti Arasampatti is a 2002 Indian Tamil-language comedy film directed by Dananjaya. The film stars Pandiarajan and Mansoor Ali Khan. It was released on 4 November 2002. The film is loosely based on the 1989 American film See No Evil, Hear No Evil which was also the inspiration for Hindi movies Hum Hain Kamaal Ke and Pyare Mohan , Marathi movie Eka Peksha Ek and Kannada movies Akka Pakka and Baduku Jataka Bandi.

Plot

Andipatti, a blind man, and Arasampatti, a deaf man, become friends. Their misadventures as they get caught in a smuggling operation and a murder. Chased by a bungling police duo, and hounded by the anti-social elements who believe the heroes have their priceless Anthrax with which they had planned to destroy the state's population, it is about how Andipatti and Arasampatti extricate themselves from the situation they had inadvertently landed themselves in.

Cast

Pandiarajan as Andipatti
Mansoor Ali Khan as Arasampatti
Vilasini 
Manorama as Andipatti's mother
Kumarimuthu as  Arasampatti's father
Senthil
Alex as Walter Pichamuthu
R. Ramadas
Ragunath

Production
Actress Jayarahini changed her stagename to Vilasini to feature in the film. Alongside her commitments for Andipatti Arasampatti, she simultaneously worked on two shelved films Sirppam and Ladies and Gentleman co-starring Livingston.

Soundtrack

the soundtrack was composed by Rock Rownder and the film score by S. P. Venkatesh. The soundtrack, released in 2002, features 6 tracks with lyrics written by Rock Rownder.

References

2002 films
2000s Tamil-language films
2000s comedy thriller films
Indian comedy thriller films
Films about blind people in India
Films about deaf people
2002 comedy films